Gierłoż may refer to the following places:
Gierłoż, Kętrzyn County in Warmian-Masurian Voivodeship (north Poland). Wolf's Lair is located in the forest nearby.
Gierłoż, Ostróda County in Warmian-Masurian Voivodeship (north Poland)
Gierłoż Polska, Iława County, in  Warmian-Masurian Voivodeship (north Poland)